"Laughter in the Rain" is a song composed and recorded by Neil Sedaka, with lyrics by Phil Cody. It includes a 20-second saxophone solo by Jim Horn.

Background
The song was released on Elton John's Rocket Records.

After hearing a version of "Laughter in the Rain" by singer Lea Roberts on the radio several weeks before the planned release of his single, Sedaka phoned Elton John to have MCA Records rush the Sedaka version to release within five days.

The opening chord of the chorus was based on that used by John in "Goodbye Yellow Brick Road", which Sedaka has described as a "drop-dead chord." He combined that with a pentatonic melody inspired by Aaron Copland. Cody claims to have written the lyrics in about five minutes after smoking marijuana and falling asleep under a tree for a couple of hours.

Chart performance
In the U.S., "Laughter in the Rain" reached #1 on the Billboard Hot 100 on February 1, 1975 (Sedaka's first single to top the Hot 100 since 1962). The song spent two weeks at the top of the adult contemporary chart.

The record was also a major hit in Canada, reaching #2 on the pop singles chart and #1 on the adult contemporary chart. It was also released in the U.K., where it spent nine weeks on the Singles Chart, peaking at #15 on June 22, 1974.

Weekly charts
Lea Roberts

Neil Sedaka

Year-end charts

Personnel

Neil Sedaka – lead vocal, piano
Danny Kortchmar – electric guitar
Dean Parks - acoustic guitar
Leland Sklar – bass guitar
Russ Kunkel – drums
Jim Horn – tenor saxophone, baritone saxophone
William "Smitty" Smith – Hammond organ, background vocals
 Abigail Haness, Brenda Gordon, Brian Russell  –  background vocals

Artie Butler  – orchestral arrangement

Cover versions
 This song was covered by Caterina Valente on her 1975 album titled Now.
 This song was covered by Johnny Mathis on his 1975 album titled When Will I See You Again.
 This song was covered by Asha Puthli on her 1975 album titled She Loves to Hear the Music.
 This song was covered by Ace Spectrum on their 1975 album entitled Low Rent Rendezvous.
 The song was covered by Earl Klugh on his 1976 self-titled album,
 It was covered by Thomas Anders (of Modern Talking fame) on his 1992 album Down on Sunset.
It was covered by Pepe Jaramillo on his Mexican Tijuana / Mexican Gold album.
 The Weather Girls covered the song on their 1985 album Big Girls Don't Cry.
 In 2007 Donny Osmond released a cover of the tune on his solo studio album Love Songs of the '70s. 
 The Ray Conniff Singers recorded a vocal harmony arrangement of the song on their 1975 album, Laughter in the Rain.
 There was also a Finnish cover version performed by Markku Aro, entitled "Kun sä Vierelläin Sateessa Oot".
 Disco funk-soul outfit Vitamin E covered this song on their 1977 release Sharing, featuring horns by Randy Brecker.
Japanese jazz band Time Five released a cover of the tune in their 1979 album 翼をください ("Tsubasa wo Kudasai"), under the title 雨の樹の下で ("Ame no kinoshitade").
 In 2017 Richie Cole released a cover of the tune on his album Latin Lover.

References

Other sources
Whitburn, Joel (1996). The Billboard Book of Top 40 Hits, 6th Edition (Billboard Publications)

External links
, recorded September 2017

1974 singles
Neil Sedaka songs
Billboard Hot 100 number-one singles
Cashbox number-one singles
Songs written by Neil Sedaka
1974 songs
Polydor Records singles
Songs with lyrics by Phil Cody
The Rocket Record Company singles